The Cooper Ministry was a ministry of the Government of Queensland and was led by Labor Premier Frank Cooper. It succeeded the Forgan Smith Ministry on 16 September 1942 following Forgan Smith's resignation from the Ministry after over 10 years as Premier. The ministry was followed by the Hanlon Ministry on 7 March 1946 following Cooper's own resignation.

First ministry
On 16 September 1942, the Governor, Sir Leslie Orme Wilson, designated 10 principal executive offices of the Government, appointed Vince Gair to the Executive Council to fill the vacancy left by Forgan Smith's resignation, and appointed the following Members of the Legislative Assembly of Queensland to the Ministry as follows:

 Frank Bulcock resigned on 15 December 1942 to take up an appointment as Commonwealth Director-General of Agriculture. On 17 December 1942, Thomas Lewis Williams was appointed in his stead to the Ministry. Additionally, Foley's portfolio was renamed from "Labour and Industry" to "Labour and Employment".

Second ministry
Labor was re-elected at the 1944 election and the Ministry was reconstituted on 27 April 1944. The Ministers served until the resignation of Frank Cooper on 7 March 1946 and the formation of a new ministry under Deputy Premier Ned Hanlon.

Notes

References
 
 
 
 
 

 

Queensland ministries
Australian Labor Party ministries in Queensland